Governagiri is a village in Ottapidaram taluk Tuticorin District Tamil Nadu India.

References

Notable personalities 
Veeran Sundaralingam

External links 
 Wikimapia

Villages in Thoothukudi district